This is a list of villages (and towns) of the Faroe Islands.

References

 
Towns
Faroe Islands